Gale D. Candaras (born January 1, 1949) was a Democratic member of the Massachusetts Senate from 2006 to 2014, representing the First Hampden and Hampshire District. She is an attorney and a former five-term member of the Massachusetts House of Representatives, where she served as a Division Leader.

Candaras was born in 1949 in Brooklyn, New York and grew up in Teaneck, New Jersey, graduating from Teaneck High School in 1967. She attended Fairleigh Dickinson University (where she graduated magna cum laude), and, in 1983, she graduated from Western New England College School of Law with a Juris Doctor. After law school, Senator Candaras worked for the Equity Trading and Arbitrage Division at Goldman Sachs in New York City. She is licensed to practice law in New York, New Jersey, Connecticut and Massachusetts. In 1987, she moved to Wilbraham, where she practiced law and held positions on the Town planning board and finance committee and served for six years on the Board of Selectmen before being elected to the Massachusetts House of Representatives in 1996. She was elected to the Massachusetts State Senate in 2006. Senator Candaras served the First Hampden and Hampshire District, which covered her hometown of Wilbraham, a portion of the City of Springfield, the Towns of Longmeadow, East Longmeadow, Ludlow, Granby, Hampden, Belchertown, and a portion of the City of Chicopee.

In February 2012, Senator Candaras was appointed by Senate President Therese Murray to chair the Joint Committee on Economic Development and Emerging Technologies. She also served as Vice Chair of the Joint Committee on the Judiciary and sits on the Joint Committees on Financial Services, Ways and Means, and Transportation as well as the Senate Committees on Post Audit and Oversight, Ways and Means, and Global Warming and Climate Change. She has previously served as Chair of the Joint Committees on Revenue and Mental Health and Substance Abuse.

Candaras announced a run for Hampden County Register of Probate in January 2014, and did not seek re-election to her Senate seat. On November 4, 2014, she was defeated by Suzanne Seguin by 278 votes.

She is married to Arthur Wolf, a professor at Western New England University School of Law and former attorney with the Civil Rights Division of the United States Department of Justice and staff attorney to Congressman Father Robert Drinan. Candaras has one son.

See also
 Massachusetts House of Representatives' 12th Hampden district

References

External links
Official Website
Senate Member Profile

1949 births
Living people
Fairleigh Dickinson University alumni
Western New England University alumni
Democratic Party Massachusetts state senators
Democratic Party members of the Massachusetts House of Representatives
People from Brooklyn
Teaneck High School alumni
Women state legislators in Massachusetts
21st-century American women